Olivier Vandecasteele is a Belgian humanitarian worker who was arrested in Iran in 2022 and sentenced to 40 years of prison in 2023.

Career
Since at least 2006, Vandecasteele has worked for international humanitarian organisations, including Médecins du Monde, Norwegian Refugee Council (NRC), and Relief International. He has worked in India, Afghanistan, and Mali. In 2015, he became the director of NRC's Iran operations, and assumed the same role in Iran for Relief International in 2020. In that position, he distributed humanitarian aid during the COVID-19 pandemic. Vandecasteele worked for Relief International until July 2021.

Detention in Iran
Vandecasteele was detained in Iran on February 24, 2022. On July 5, 2022, Belgium's justice minister Vincent Van Quickenborne claimed that Vandecasteele was being held on fabricated "espionage" charges. 

In December 2022, the Belgian government stated that Iran had sentenced him to 28 years in prison, although in January 2023,  the BBC reported that he had been sentenced to 40 years in prison and 74 lashes for spying, money laundering and currency smuggling. Vandecasteele denied the charges against him.

The Iranian government wishes to exchange Vandecasteele for Assadollah Assadi, a diplomat jailed in Belgium.

See also 
 List of foreign nationals detained in Iran

References

Year of birth missing (living people)
Living people
Prisoners and detainees of Iran
Belgian humanitarians
Belgium–Iran relations
fa:الیویر فانده‌کاستیله